Edward F. Davis (March 2, 1922 – November 3, 1986), known professionally as Eddie "Lockjaw" Davis, was an American jazz tenor saxophonist.
It is unclear how he acquired the moniker "Lockjaw" (later shortened in "Jaws"): it is either said that it came from the title of a tune or from his way of biting hard on the saxophone mouthpiece. Other theories have been put forward.

Biography
Davis played with Cootie Williams, Lucky Millinder, Andy Kirk, Eddie Bonnemère, Louis Armstrong, and Count Basie, as well as leading his own bands and making many recordings as a leader. He played in the swing, bop, hard bop, Latin jazz, and soul jazz genres. Some of his recordings from the 1940s also could be classified as rhythm and blues.

In 1940, when Teddy Hill became the manager of the legendary Minton's Jazz club, he put Eddie Davis in charge of deciding which musicians could, or couldn't, sit in during the jam sessions (playing in this Minton's sessions was coveted by many, including musicians which were not up to the demanding standards of the venue).

His 1946 band, Eddie Davis and His Beboppers, featured Fats Navarro, Al Haig, Huey Long, Gene Ramey and Denzil Best.

In the 1950s, he was playing with Sonny Stitt, while from 1960 to 1962, he and fellow tenor saxophonist Johnny Griffin led a quintet. 

Starting in 1955, and up to 1960, Eddie Davis pioneered the tenor sax/Hammond organ combo, in a group featuring Shirley Scott on the Hammond B3.

From the mid-1960s, Davis and Griffin also performed together as part of the Kenny Clarke/Francy Boland Big Band, along with other, mainly European, jazz musicians.

Davis died of Hodgkin's lymphoma in Culver City, California, at the age of 64.

Discography

As leader/co-leader
 1954: Goodies from Eddie Davis (Roost [10" LP])
 1955: The Battle of Birdland [live] (Roost) – with Sonny Stitt
 1956: Modern Jazz Expressions (King)
 1956: Jazz With a Horn (King) – also released as This and That (King, 1959)
 1956–57: Jazz With a Beat (King) – with Shirley Scott; released 1958
 1957: Big Beat Jazz (King) – released 1958
 1957: Uptown (King) – released 1958
 1957: Count Basie Presents Eddie Davis Trio + Joe Newman (Roulette)
 1958: Eddie Davis Trio Featuring Shirley Scott, Organ (Roulette)
 1958: The Eddie Davis Trio Featuring Shirley Scott, Organ (Roost) 
 1958: The Eddie "Lockjaw" Davis Cookbook, Vol. 1 (Prestige) – with Shirley Scott, Jerome Richardson; also released as In the Kitchen (Prestige, 1969)
 1958: Jaws (Prestige) – with Shirley Scott
 1958: The Eddie "Lockjaw" Davis Cookbook, Vol. 2 (Prestige) – with Shirley Scott, Jerome Richardson; also released as The Rev (Prestige, 1970)
 1958: The Eddie "Lockjaw" Davis Cookbook Volume 3 (Prestige) – with Shirley Scott, Jerome Richardson; released 1961
 1958: Smokin' [the 4th volume in the Cookbook series] (Prestige) – with Shirley Scott, Jerome Richardson; released 1964
 1959: Very Saxy (Prestige) – with Buddy Tate, Coleman Hawkins, Arnett Cobb
 1959: Jaws in Orbit (Prestige) – with Steve Pulliam, Shirley Scott
 1959: Bacalao (Prestige) – with Shirley Scott
 1960: Eddie "Lockjaw" Davis with Shirley Scott (Moodsville) note: Scott also on piano
 1960: Misty (Moodsville) – with Shirley Scott; released 1963
 1960: Afro-Jaws (Riverside) – with Ray Barretto; also released as Alma Alegre (Jazzland, 1964)
 1960: Battle Stations (Prestige) – with Johnny Griffin, Norman Simmons; released 1963 
 1960: Trane Whistle (Prestige) – with big band arranged by Oliver Nelson, Ernie Wilkins
 1960: Tough Tenors (Jazzland) – with Johnny Griffin, Junior Mance
 1960: Griff & Lock (Jazzland) – with Johnny Griffin, Junior Mance; released 1961
 1961: The Tenor Scene (Prestige) – with Johnny Griffin, Junior Mance; also released as The Breakfast Show (Prestige, 1966)
 1961: The First Set (Prestige) – with Johnny Griffin, Junior Mance; released 1964
 1961: The Midnight Show (Prestige) – with Johnny Griffin, Junior Mance; released 1965
 1961: The Late Show (Prestige) – with Johnny Griffin, Junior Mance; released 1965
 1961: Lookin' at Monk! (Jazzland) – with Johnny Griffin, Junior Mance
 1961: Blues Up & Down (Jazzland) – with Johnny Griffin, Lloyd Mayers; released 1962
 1962: Tough Tenor Favorites (Jazzland) – with Johnny Griffin, Horace Parlan
 1962: Jawbreakers (Riverside) – with Harry "Sweets" Edison 
 1962: Goin' to the Meeting (Prestige) – with Horace Parlan
 1962: I Only Have Eyes for You (Prestige) – with Don Patterson; released 1963
 1962: Trackin' (Prestige) – with Don Patterson; released 1963
 1966: Lock, the Fox (RCA Victor) – with Ross Tompkins
 1967: The Fox & the Hounds (RCA Victor) – with big band arranged by Bobby Plater
 1968: Love Calls (RCA Victor) – with Paul Gonsalves
 1970: Tough Tenors Again 'n' Again (MPS) – with Johnny Griffin
 1974: Leapin' on Lenox (Black & Blue)
 1975: The Tenor Giants Featuring Oscar Peterson (Pablo) – with Zoot Sims
 1975: Light and Lovely (Black & Blue) – with Harry "Sweets" Edison
 1975: Chewin' the Fat (Spotlite)
 1976: Jaws Strikes Again (Black & Blue) – with Wild Bill Davis
 1976: Swingin' Till the Girls Come Home (SteepleChase; Inner City)
 1976: Straight Ahead (Pablo)
 1976: Lockjaw with Sweets (Storyville) – with Harry "Sweets" Edison
 1976: Opus Funk (Storyville) – with Harry "Sweets" Edison
 1977: Eddie "Lockjaw" Davis 4 – Montreux '77 (Pablo)
 1977: Simply Sweets (Pablo) – with Harry "Sweets" Edison, Dolo Coker
 1978: Midnight Slows Vol. 10 (Black & Blue) – with Bill Doggett
 1979: The Heavy Hitter (Muse)
 1981: Jaw's Blues (Enja) – with Horace Parlan; released 1986
 1981: Sonny, Sweets & Jaws – Recorded Live at Bubba's (Who's Who in Jazz) – with Sonny Stitt, Harry "Sweets" Edison 
 1983: Eddie "Lockjaw" Davis/Harry "Sweets" Edison/Al Grey – Jazz at the Philharmonic 1983 (Pablo) – recorded 1982
 1983: All of Me (SteepleChase) – with Kenny Drew
 1983: Jazz at the Philharmonic – Yoyogi National Stadium, Tokyo 1983: Return to Happiness (Pablo)
 1984: Tough Tenors Back Again! (Storyville) – with Johnny Griffin; released 1998

As sideman
With Mildred Anderson
 Person to Person (Bluesville, 1960) – with Shirley Scott

With Count Basie
 The Count! (Clef, 1952 [rel. 1955])
 Basie Jazz (Clef, 1952 [rel. 1954])
 Dance Session Album #2 (Clef, 1954)
 The Atomic Mr. Basie (Roulette, 1957) – originally titled Basie; also known as E=MC2
 Everyday I Have the Blues (Roulette, 1959)
 The Count Basie Story (Roulette, 1960)
 Pop Goes the Basie (Reprise, 1965)
 Basie Meets Bond (United Artists, 1966)
 Live at the Sands (Before Frank) (Reprise, 1966 [rel. 1998])
 Sinatra at the Sands (Reprise, 1966) 
 Basie's Beatle Bag (Verve, 1966)
 Basie Swingin' Voices Singin' (ABC-Paramount, 1966)
 Basie's Beat (Verve, 1967)
 Broadway Basie's...Way (Command, 1966)
 Hollywood...Basie's Way (Command, 1967)
 Basie's in the Bag (Brunswick, 1967)
 Count Basie Captures Walt Disney's The Happiest Millionaire (Coliseum, 1967)
 Manufacturers of Soul (Brunswick, 1968)
 The Board of Directors Annual Report (Dot, 1968) 
 Basie Straight Ahead (Dot, 1968)
 How About This (Paramount, 1968)
 Standing Ovation (Dot, 1969)
 Basic Basie (MPS, 1969)
 Basie on the Beatles (Happy Tiger, 1969)
 High Voltage (MPS, 1970)
 Basie Jam (Pablo, 1973)
 Mostly Blues...and Some Others (Pablo, 1983)

With Billy Butler
 Don't Be That Way (Black & Blue, 1976)
With Benny Carter
Wonderland (Pablo, 1976 [1986])
With the Kenny Clarke/Francy Boland Big Band
 Sax No End (SABA, 1967)
With Arnett Cobb
 Blow Arnett, Blow (Prestige, 1959) – also released as Go Power!!! (Prestige, 1970)
With Gene "Mighty Flea" Conners
 Coming Home (Black & Blue, 1976) 
With Wild Bill Davis
 All Right OK You Win (Black & Blue, 1976) 
With Harry Edison
 Just Friends (Black & Blue, 1975)
Edison's Lights (Pablo, 1976)
With Red Garland
 The Red Garland Trio + Eddie "Lockjaw" Davis (Moodsville, 1959)
With Dizzy Gillespie
 The Dizzy Gillespie Big 7 (Pablo, 1975)
With Al Grey 
Shades of Grey (Tangerine, 1965)
With Tiny Grimes
 Callin' the Blues (Prestige, 1958) 
With Coleman Hawkins
 Night Hawk (Swingville, 1960)
With Jo Jones
The Main Man (Pablo, 1977)
With Quincy Jones
 Golden Boy (Mercury, 1964)
With Al Smith
 Hear My Blues (Bluesville, 1959)  – with Shirley Scott; also released as Blues Shout! (Prestige, 1964)
With Sonny Stitt
 The Matadors Meet the Bull (Roulette, 1965)

References

External links
 
 Eddie "Lockjaw" Davis at BBC Music
  performing with the Count Basie Orchestra
 

1922 births
1986 deaths
20th-century African-American musicians
20th-century American male musicians
20th-century American musicians
20th-century saxophonists
African-American saxophonists
American jazz tenor saxophonists
American male jazz musicians
American male saxophonists
Apollo Records artists
Bebop saxophonists
Black & Blue Records artists
Count Basie Orchestra members
Enja Records artists
Hard bop saxophonists
Jazz tenor saxophonists
Kenny Clarke/Francy Boland Big Band members
Latin jazz saxophonists
Muse Records artists
Prestige Records artists
Riverside Records artists
Soul-jazz saxophonists
SteepleChase Records artists
Swing saxophonists